The North–South Expressway Southern Route  is an interstate controlled-access highway running parallel to the southwestern coast of Peninsular Malaysia. The expressway forms the south section of the North–South Expressway, connecting the states of Selangor, Negeri Sembilan, Malacca and Johor. It begins at Seri Kembangan, near the state/territory boundary between Selangor and Kuala Lumpur and travels southwards to end at Pandan-Tebrau in Johor.

The expressway is the third longest in Peninsular Malaysia, after its northern counterpart and the East Coast Expressway.

The Kilometre Zero of the entire expressway is located at the Pandan Interchange with the Johor Bahru Eastern Dispersal Link Expressway.

Route background

Sungai Besi to Nilai North
The expressway begins at the Sungai Besi toll plaza. The Kuala Lumpur–Seremban Expressway links Sungai Besi toll plaza to Jalan Istana and the Besraya Expressway near the Sungai Besi RMAF base. This section is a six-lane carriageway. This section serve the southwestern part of Klang Valley, passing by a few major towns.

The expressway connect to Universiti Putra Malaysia via UPM Interchange, which also provide connection to nearby other suburban towns like Seri Kembangan via Besraya and Putrajaya via SKVE as well as Universiti Tenaga Nasional (UNITEN) nearby. Kajang interchange however is an interchange with Kajang SILK E18 on their Country Heights Interchange, before connecting it to Kajang town and the rest of E18 network. Bangi Interchange connects to Bandar Baru Bangi township and National University of Malaysia (UKM). Newly build Southville City Interchange links to Federal Route 31 (Banting-Kajang Route) which provide access to Dengkil and Semenyih after passing the Southville City new developments. Putra Mahkota, the last interchange of the Selangor part of the route, connects to Bandar Seri Putra housing developments. The state border of Selangor-Negeri Sembilan follows after.

This section only has laybys on Serdang and Nilai, with Nilai southbound also provide access to Nilai Memorial Park. However what makes them different from other laybys is the food stalls building is also present in these laybys, which makes their function similar to rest areas.

Nilai North to Seremban 

From this point the expressway enters Negeri Sembilan, running southwesterly towards Nilai. The interchange to ELITE E6 lies in the northern part of Nilai, near the Selangor–Negeri Sembilan border, enabling motorists from the south to Shah Alam and Klang while bypassing Kuala Lumpur. This section has been upgraded to eight-lane carriageway to accommodate heavy traffic due to this fact. 

Nilai interchange gives access to Bandar Baru Nilai and Nilai 3 business centre. The expressway later continues to cross on Recron factory, quarries and estates and also the northernmost rest area of the route which is Seremban R&R. Later only continues to Bandar Ainsdale Interchange, which links to Bandar Ainsdale new developments as well serving as new northernmost interchange to Seremban. Seremban Interchange provides direct access to Seremban city centre and also closes the gap between the expressway and Federal Route 1.

Seremban to Senawang

This section links to Seremban City proper and Senawang. Between this section there's Port Dickson interchange, which isn't connecting the expressway to Port Dickson town but rather the Seremban-Port Dickson E29 expressway which itself isn't directly connected to the expressway but rather on the westward stretch of Federal Route 53 linked. The eight-lane dual-carriageway continues on this section. Senawang Interchange serves as southernmost interchange of Seremban area, which connects Senawang and Seremban Jaya residential areas. The route continues to run parallel to Federal Route 1.

Senawang to Ayer Keroh

The expressway returns to a six-lane dual-carriageway with lanes are divided with a line of trees. This is the section where the route started back to distance from Federal Route 1 as the expressway routes into Malacca.

Malacca-Negeri Sembilan border is situated a few kilometers before Simpang Ampat Interchange, and as the exit provides access to Simpang Ampat and Tampin nearby, it also being the last serving close connection to Federal Route 1 before both started to distance between them, with FT1 goes southeast, and E1 goes southwest into Malacca and run parallel, but distant with Lebuh AMJ FT19. Ayer Keroh is the only interchange that links close to the state's central areas, with a few kilometres north lies the only overhead restaurant of E2 which shares the same name.

Ayer Keroh to Pagoh

The expressway becomes a four-lane dual-carriageway expressway. Along these section also the divider between lanes is decorated with flower trees instead. This is also where the only concrete pavement is done in this route, particularly between Ayer Keroh - Jasin part. 

The route started to goes on their own route as FT19 became more distant and therefore ending after Malacca border, yet still so far with FT1 to close with. Past Sungai Kesang (Johor-Malacca border), the northernmost Johor exit is Tangkak, which aside from connecting to the textile border town, connects on FT23 which gives connection to major northwest towns of Johor, particularly close to Muar and further to Segamat. Both Bukit Gambir and Pagoh exits also provides connection to Muar. 

The northbound Pagoh R&R is also situated here.

Pagoh to Skudai
The longest distance between two interchanges of the entire expressway lies in this section on Pagoh interchange to Yong Peng North interchange, a 42.98 km distance between both interchanges. As it also passes through Mount Maokil and surrounding hilly areas, a climbing lane is established on the section.  

The expressway finally connects to the Federal Route 1 directly via Yong Peng South exit, and going southbound both route runs back close in parallel until the terminus. Ayer Hitam interchange also connects to Federal Route 50, the central Johor main road which links the west coast and east coast part of the state from Batu Pahat to Mersing via Kluang as well as the ceramic town itself. 

The southernmost rest area for the whole expressway lies in Machap, just 2 kilometres from the Machap exit. 

The route then later enters the Iskandar Johor corridor starting from Kulai interchange which led towards Kulai town. 

The Senai North interchange links the expressway to the Second Link E3 expressway which allows motorists a direct access to the Malaysia-Singapore Second Link Bridge to Tuas, Singapore, as well as connecting Senai airport areas before going southwest. The main route goes straight to Johor Bahru proper.

Skudai to Johor Bahru
Closed toll fares ends begins and ends on Skudai toll plaza, with Kempas toll plaza uses an open-toll collection system. The route keep being linked to the parallel Federal Route 1 with Skudai gives main access to Skudai town centre before going southeast to serve a few towns in Iskandar Puteri and Johor Bahru city areas. The route is also linked with Pasir Gudang Highway (FT17) on Pasir Gudang Interchange.

On the last segment, the expressway finally terminates at its interchange with the Johor Bahru Eastern Dispersal Link Expressway  and also the only part which links the route with Federal Route 3, the peninsular East Coast backbone. Both routes goes down to the city centre and links to Johor Causeway.

Speed limits
Signed exceptions include:
  when approaching any toll plaza
  from Sungai Besi to Bangi

There are no signed minimum speed limits.

Features

The Sungai Besi toll plaza has the second highest number of toll booths in Malaysia, thus making the stretch of highway at the Sungai Besi toll plaza the second widest road in Malaysia with more than 18 lanes (excluding additional toll booths) before Batu Kawan toll plaza at Sultan Abdul Halim Muadzam Shah Bridge (Penang Second Bridge) which has 28 lanes. The Pagoh–Yong Peng (North) section is the longest stretch of the North–South Expressway network. This 47-kilometre stretch passes Mount Maokil and the plains of Seri Medan and Sungai Sarang Buaya.

Tolls
Most of the expressway maintains a ticket system (closed system) of tolling. The expressway however also has one toll plaza using the barrier toll system (open system) at Kempas. The ticket system from Skudai northwards uses an integrated system of tolling that also applies to the North–South Expressway Central Link, New Klang Valley Expressway and North–South Expressway Northern Route (e.g. it is possible to travel from Skudai, Johor on this expressway to Juru, Penang on the North–South Expressway Northern Route without leaving the toll system). The toll rate for the ticket system for passenger cars excluding taxis as of 2011 is 13.6 sen per kilometre.

Toll rates

Closed toll systems
Calculated below is maximum rate between Skudai and Sungai Besi, the furthest ends of this section closed system.

Kempas Toll Plaza

Services

Emergency assistance and information services
Orange emergency telephones/callboxes are located every two kilometres along the entire expressway, as with every other expressway in the PLUS expressway network. Alternatively, commuters may dial the toll-free number 1 800 88 0000 on their mobile phones. Both will connect to the PLUS traffic monitoring centre in Subang where commuters may request for traffic information or roadside assistance. The highway patrol and roadside assistance teams are known as PLUSRonda. They provide free first responder services including small fixes for broken down vehicles, towing and also act as traffic police when there is an incident. They are also given auxiliary police powers.

PLUS also provides traffic information to commuters through variable-message signs located on some sections of the expressway, and on Twitter @plustrafik in Malay. Major radio stations in Peninsular Malaysia also broadcast traffic updates for the expressway.

Rest areas

The North–South Expressway southern route has 8 full rest areas (which includes one overhead bridge restaurant), 20 laybys and one vista point (scenic area) total along both directions of the expressway. Every rest area and layby includes, as a bare minimum, car parks and public toilets. Most laybys also include public telephones and a small rest hut. Depending on location, laybys can also include petrol stations, a surau, and rarely, food courts, independently operated restaurants and automated teller machines. Full rest and service areas have all of the above services and are much larger, so they can accommodate more services. Several rest areas also have small inns, and most have complimentary Wi-Fi services. Vista points only have car parks and are meant for commuters to enjoy the scenery at that location. Laybys are found every 25 to 50 kilometres, while full rest areas are found every 80 to 100 kilometres. The only vista point on this expressway is in Pedas Linggi.

History

Original route
The construction of the North-South Expressway includes the acquisition and upgrades of several major roads as follows:-

Development

Six-lane widening works
The Senawang Interchange and the Ayer Keroh Interchange received new four lane sections in 2003. The Ayer Keroh Interchange had two-lane carriageways until 2009, when it was upgraded to three and four lanes, ending at Sungai Besi commencing again at E37 Kuala Lumpur–Seremban Expressway.

Phase 1: Seremban–Senawang
In July, 2007, a six lane section from Kuala Lumpur to Seremban Interchange Exit 218 was extended to Senawang Interchange Exit 220.

Phase 2: Seremban–Ayer Keroh
The next phase of these works, the extension of the Senawang Interchange Exit 220 to the Ayer Keroh Interchange Exit 231 was completed in December, 2007.

Fourth lane addition
In July 2010, the operator, PLUS Expressways Berhad, announced that the government had awarded contracts to build a fourth lane on a stretch from Nilai (North) to Seremban. The construction was completed in 2015.

Exit 236 Bukit Gambir Interchange
An interchange between Tangkak and Pagoh Interchange was opened to traffic on 26 January 2014, there will be three interchange that will be linking from the interchanges to Muar, Johor.

Exit 217 Bandar Ainsdale (Seremban North) Interchange
An interchange between Nilai and Seremban Interchange was opened to traffic on 10 July 2015, there will be four interchange that will be linking from the interchanges to Seremban, Negeri Sembilan.

Exit 212A Southville City Interchange
An interchange between Bangi and Putra Mahkota Interchange was opened to traffic on April 11, 2018, there will be five interchange that will be linking from the interchanges to Bangi, Selangor.

Junction list

References

External links
 PLUS Expressway Berhad
 PLUS
 Malaysian Highway Authority

Expressways in Malaysia
North–South Expressway (Malaysia)